Pławęcino  (German: Plauenthin) is a village in the administrative district of Gmina Gościno, within Kołobrzeg County, West Pomeranian Voivodeship, in north-western Poland.

In previous centuries, the village of Plauenthin had been a manor type of fief owned in succession by various noble families.

The village has a population of 167.

References

Villages in Kołobrzeg County